Taveta or Tubeta is a Northeast Coast Bantu language spoken by the Taveta people of Kenya. It is closely related to Pare (called Chasu by speakers).

Taveta was confused with Dawida by Jouni Maho in his (2009) classification.

Christian Literature
Items in Taveta were first published by Anglican missionaries.  Rev. Albert Remington Steggall worked with a native called Yohana Nene Mdighirri, to translated the Scriptures into Taveta. In 1892 the Gospels of Mark and John were published as Sumu Yedi ya Isa Masiya, hena Marko and Sumu Yedi, yakwe Yohana. They were printed at the Church Mission Society CMS Station. In 1894, the epistles 1-3 John were published. In 1896 The Gospels according to St. Matthew and St. Luke were published by BFBS as Sumu Yedi yakwe Yesu Masihi hena Mattayo and Sumu Yedi yakwe Yesu Masihi (niye Jesus Christ) hena Luka. In 1897 the book of Exodus was published as Kitamo cha keri cha Musa chaitangwa ‘Kufuma’, printed at the Office of the Taveta Chronicle. The bulk of this edition was destroyed by a fire in 1903. In 1900 the Acts of the Apostles were published by the British and Foreign Bible Society, BFBS as Mihiro ya Waondo. Also in 1900 the Epistles of St. James, St. Peter, and St. Jude were published as Mawaraka Mawo Waondo Yakobo, Petro, na Yuda. They were printed at the CMS Taveta Mission Station. In 1903 the Gospel of Mark was revised from the 1892 edition and published by BFBS. In 1894 the Society for Promoting Christian Knowledge published the Book of Common Prayer as Taveta Kitamo cha Kuomba.  In 1895 Steggall published, through the SPCK, Hymns in the language of Taveta. In 1905 The Psalms were published by SPCK as Malumbo, hena viteto vya kituweta: (the Psalms, in the language of Taveta), and printed by Richard Clay and Sons of Bungay. There were published by SPCK. In 1906 the Epistles and the Revelation were published as Mawaraka na Ujughuo: hena viteto vya kiyuweta: (the Epistles and the Revelation in Taveta), and these completed the New Testament.

References

Northeast Coast Bantu languages